Henry Gangte (born 21 September 1989) is an Indian former professional footballer who played as a midfielder for numerous I-League clubs, such as Mohun Bagan, Air India, and Shillong Lajong. He also had stints with lower division sides Bengal Mumbai and Mumbai Tigers.

Indian footballers
1989 births
Living people
I-League players
Mumbai Tigers FC players
Footballers from Manipur
Association football midfielders
Tata Football Academy players
Shillong Lajong FC players
Bengal Mumbai FC players